This is a list of administrators and governors of Bendel State, Nigeria. Mid-Western region was created in June 1963 from the Benin and Delta provinces. The status of the region was changed to a state on 27 May 1967, and the state was renamed Bendel State on 17 March 1976.  
Bendel State was divided into Delta State and Edo State on 27 August 1991.

See also
List of Governors of Delta State
List of Governors of Edo State
States of Nigeria
List of state governors of Nigeria

References

Bendel
Politics of Bendel State